Scott Miller (December 24, 1955 – May 18, 2008) was an American painter based in Cleveland, Ohio.

Education and career 
He studied from 1974 to 1978 at the Cooper School of Art and at the Cleveland Institute of Art from 1980 to 1983.

Exhibitions

Solo exhibitions

1980–1989 
 Weller/Potosky Gallery - Toronto, Canada
Aquilon - Cleveland, Ohio
Midtown Gallery - Cleveland, Ohio
Summer Gallery - Cleveland, Ohio
Art Site Gallery - Cleveland, Ohio
Kent State Center Gallery - Kent, Ohio
Karamu Gallery - Cleveland, Ohio
Joyce Porcelli Gallery - Cleveland, Ohio
Artemesia Gallery - Chicago, Illinois

1990–1999 
 The Akron Museum of Art - Akron, Ohio
Art Lick Gallery - San Francisco, California
Art in the Powerhouse - Cleveland, Ohio
Cleveland Independent Art - Cleveland, Ohio
OBOE Gallery - Cleveland, Ohio
Aquilon - Cleveland, Ohio

2000–2008 
 Don O'Mellveny Gallery - Los Angeles, California
Herb Ascherman Gallery - Cleveland, Ohio
OBOE Gallery - Cleveland, Ohio
Art Metro Gallery - Cleveland, Ohio
Klapper Gallery - Los Angeles, California
Edgar Varela Fine Arts - Los Angeles, California

Group exhibitions

1980–1989 
The Cleveland Museum of Art - Cleveland, Ohio
Weller/Potosky Gallery - Toronto, Canada
Spaces/Hallwalls - Buffalo, New York
Artists' Society International - San Francisco, California
James Hunt Barker Gallery - Palm Beach, Florida
Lucky Street Gallery - Key West, Florida
Cleveland Center for Contemporary Art - Cleveland, Ohio
N.O.V.A. - Cleveland, Ohio
Spaces Gallery - Cleveland, Ohio
The New Figuration - Cleveland, Ohio

1990–1999 
The Cleveland Museum of Art - Cleveland, Ohio
Midtown Gallery - Cleveland, Ohio
World Tattoo Gallery - New York, NY
Penson Gallery - New York, NY
Feature Gallery - New York, NY
Evanston Art Center - Evanston, Illinois
Artemesia Gallery - Chicago, Illinois
Hyde Park Institute - Chicago, Illinois

2000–2008 
Toyoda Museum - Nagoya, Japan
William Merrill Gallery - Laguna Beach, California
Gallery 33 - Long Beach, California
Don O'Melveny Gallery - Los Angeles, California
Cast Iron Gallery - New York, NY

Prominent collectors 
Peter Lewis - Philanthropist
Richard Armstrong - Director, Solomon R. Guggenheim Museum
Hugh Hefner/Playboy Enterprises
Henry Hawley - Head Curator, Cleveland Museum of Art
Progressive Insurance Corporation
Flemming Flindt - Choreographer
Akron Museum of Art
British Petroleum
Allen Ginsberg - Poet

External links 
 Miller, Scott. Untitled, 1986, Cleveland Museum of Art.
 Litt, Steven. "Noted Cleveland artist Scott Miller dead at 52", The Plain Dealer, May 20, 2008.
 Glassman, Anthony. "Artist who died at home was not a victim of foul play", Gay People's Chronicle (Ohio), May 23, 2008.
 Roulet, Norm.  "Artist for Eternity: Rest in Peace, Scott Miller", Regional Economics Action Links North East Ohio (RealNeo), May 20, 2008.
 "IN MEMORANDUM, an exhibition of the works by Scott Miller (1955–2008)", Convivium 33 Gallery, March 14, 2012.
 Scott Miller Original Oil Painting, WorthPoint, August 8, 2013.

References 

1955 births
2008 deaths
American contemporary painters
Artists from Cleveland
20th-century American painters
American male painters
20th-century American male artists